James Faulkner is an English actor. He is best known for playing Pope Sixtus IV in the television series Da Vinci's Demons (2013–2015), Randyll Tarly in the television series Game of Thrones (2016–2017), and Saint Paul in the film Paul, Apostle of Christ (2018).

Filmography

Film

Television

Video games

References

External links

English male film actors
English male television actors
English male voice actors
Living people
20th-century English male actors
21st-century English male actors
Male actors from London
Year of birth missing (living people)